The 2011 Super Fours was the eighth cricket Super Fours season. This was the first time the competition had been played since 2008, having been cancelled in 2009 and 2010 due to a busy international schedule. It took place in May and saw 4 teams compete in 50 over and Twenty20 matches. There was no overall winner in the 50 over tournament, whilst Sapphires won the Twenty20 tournament, their third title in the format.

Competition format
In the one day tournament, each team played two games, with no overall winner declared.

The Twenty20 competition consisted of two semi-finals, with the winners progressing to a Final and the losers playing in a third-place play-off.

Teams

50 over

Results

Twenty20

Semi-finals

Third-place play-off

Final

References

Super Fours
2011 in English women's cricket